Statistics of DPR Korea Football League in the 2003 season.

Overview
4.25 Sports Club won the championship.

DPR Korea Football League seasons
1
Korea
Korea